Rivaldo González Kiese (born 23 December 1987) is a Paraguayan football player who plays for Guayaquil City Fútbol Club in Ecuador's 2nd Division.

Rivaldo also holds Spanish nationality. He is an attacking midfielder.

Career
Born in Asunción, the capital of Paraguay, Rivaldo transferred to Italy at young age. Despite being young, he played for the first team of Venezia. After the club was bankrupted, he left for Genoa. That season, he played 9 times in the 2005–06 Serie C1. The club finished as runner-up, winning the promotion playoffs. In August 2006 he left, along with Michele Bacis and Stefano De Angelis.

In 2007, he left for Challenge League club Lugano, from the Italian speaking region of Switzerland. Genoan teammates Tiago Pires, Alessandro Di Maio and Diogo Tavares also joined this club.

In January 2008 he returned to Italy to play for Potenza.

In August 2008 he left Potenza for SPAL along with Mirko Martucci in a co-ownership deal for a peppercorn fee of €500 each (€1,000 in total). He played 7 games before Genoa gave up the remaining 50% registration rights to SPAL, which caused Genoa to register a financial loss of €500 in 2009 financial year, as the revenue of the other half was already booked into the 2008 financial year.

In 2009, he left for Lega Pro Seconda Divisione club Gubbio, rejoining former Venice teammate Rodrigue Boisfer. The club won the promotion playoffs and was promoted.

He returned to South America and played 6 times for Patronato in 2010–11 Clausura season of Primera B Nacional.

Rivaldo subsequently returned to Italy for the second division club; Bari in July 2011, signing a 2-year contract. He also re-joined former Gubbio coach Vincenzo Torrente.

References

External links
 
 AIC.Football.it Profile 

1987 births
Living people
Paraguayan people of Spanish descent
Sportspeople from Asunción
Paraguayan footballers
Association football midfielders
Venezia F.C. players
Genoa C.F.C. players
U.S. Avellino 1912 players
FC Lugano players
Potenza S.C. players
S.P.A.L. players
A.S. Gubbio 1910 players
Club Atlético Patronato footballers
S.S.C. Bari players
Deportivo Capiatá players
Guayaquil City F.C. footballers
Serie C players
Serie B players
Swiss Challenge League players
Serie D players
Primera Nacional players
Ecuadorian Serie A players
Paraguayan expatriate footballers
Paraguayan expatriate sportspeople in Italy
Paraguayan expatriate sportspeople in Switzerland
Paraguayan expatriate sportspeople in Argentina
Paraguayan expatriate sportspeople in Ecuador
Expatriate footballers in Italy
Expatriate footballers in Switzerland
Expatriate footballers in Argentina
Expatriate footballers in Ecuador